Ansar Ahmad (born 10 April 1964) is an Indonesian politician who served as the governor of Riau Islands following the 2020 gubernatorial election. He had previously served as a member of the People's Representative Council, and before that he served 10 years as regent of Bintan Regency.

Early life
Ahmad was born in the town of Kijang, in Bintan Island, on 10 April 1964. He later studied economics at the University of Riau in Pekanbaru.

Career
After graduating, he began to work at the local government of Riau Islands (at the time a regency) as an employee of the regional revenue office. After being promoted several times, he eventually became head of economics in Riau Islands, and in 2000 the municipal council elected him as vice-regent for Riau Islands. As the regent, Huzrin Hood, was removed by the Supreme Court in 2003, Ahmad became the acting regent. He was first elected as Bintan's regent following the 2005 regency election, in a six-candidate race where he won with 32.4 percent of votes, and he was sworn in on 10 August 2005. He was reelected in 2010 and served his second term until its expiry on 10 August 2015. He ran as the running mate of Soeryo Respatiyono during the 2015 gubernatorial elections for Riau Islands, but the pair lost.

In the 2019 legislative election, Ahmad was elected to the People's Representative Council in the Riau Islands electoral district, placing first among other legislature candidates there after securing 45,699 votes. Within the legislature, he was assigned to its fifth commission.

He later was elected governor of Riau Islands in the 2020 gubernatorial elections with Marlin Agustina as his running mate, with the pair winning 39.97% of votes. One of his primary programs is the construction of the Batam-Bintan Bridge, which he endorsed for during his term as a legislator and during campaigning for the gubernatorial election.

He is a member of Golkar, and has served as chairman of the party's Riau Islands branch between 2005 and 2020.

References

Living people
1964 births
Golkar politicians
Members of the People's Representative Council, 2019
Mayors and regents of places in the Riau Islands
University of Riau alumni